BUG is a Croatian monthly computer and information technology magazine, established in 1992 by a Croatian programmer and journalist Robert Gabelić. Published by the BUG publishing company, it is currently one of the most popular computer magazines in the country. It focuses primarily on PC hardware and software technology. The magazine also includes sections for video games, news, columnist writing (John C. Dvorak was a regular contributor), a helpdesk, and self-assembly.

Other magazines published by the same company are Mreža for professionals and Enter for beginners.

Specifications

The magazine is named after the computing term bug. It has approximately 170 pages of content (with a DVD+R DL disc); it is sold in the SE European region of Croatia, Bosnia and Herzegovina, Montenegro, North Macedonia, and Slovenia. The current editor-in-chief is Miroslav Rosandić.

Software-related content usually centers around material for Windows users with occasional attention given to Macintosh and Linux. The magazine also takes part in hardware test rating (e.g., cameras, laptops, computer parts, and storage devices), internet phenomena articles, and some other material. Each year, the magazine publishes a list of the 25 top websites in Croatia.

Issue 200
The pages experienced a redesign in 2009, with the publication of the 200th issue of the magazine. The redesign was done after the associated website was revamped. In November 2010, the website launched a mobile version.

References

External links
  
 Enter Subsidiary website 
 Games Master site 

1992 establishments in Croatia
Computer magazines published in Croatia
Croatian-language magazines
Magazines established in 1992
Mass media in Zagreb
Monthly magazines